The Dewey Formation is a geologic formation in Iowa and Oklahoma. It preserves fossils dating back to the Carboniferous period.

See also

 List of fossiliferous stratigraphic units in Iowa
 Paleontology in Iowa

References

 

Carboniferous Kansas
Carboniferous Iowa
Carboniferous geology of Oklahoma
Carboniferous southern paleotropical deposits